Vicus Turris is a former Roman and Byzantine town of Africa and a titular see of the Roman Catholic Church.

The town is identified with modern Henchir-El-Djemel, near Sakiet Ezzit in the Gouvernorat of Safaqis, Tunisia (North Africa). Henchir-El-Djemel is located at  34°53'50" N and 10°46'51" E  just north of Sfax. It is situated on a wadi, 7 km from the Mediterranean coast with an elevation of 57 meters above sea level.  Hennchir el Djemel is also known as Hanshīr al Jamal, and Henchir el Jemel.

References

 
Populated places in Sfax Governorate
Communes of Tunisia
Roman towns and cities in Tunisia
Catholic titular sees in Africa